The men's 25 metre military pistol was one of the five sport shooting events on the 1896 Summer Olympics shooting programme. 16 competitors from four nations entered the military pistol match, held on 10 April. Each shot thirty rounds in five strings of six at a target 25 metres away. The winner, John Paine of the United States, hit the target 25 times. His brother, Sumner Paine, hit the target 23 times. They used American-made military Colt revolvers.

Background

This was the only appearance of the men's 25 metre military pistol event.

Competition format

The competition had each shooter fire 30 shots, in 5 strings of 6, at a range of 25 metres. Scoring involved multiplying target hits by points scored in each string. Each target had a score of up to 6. The maximum score possible in each string of shots was 216 (6 hits times 6 scores of 6); for the 5-string total, the maximum was 1080 points.

Schedule

The military pistol event was held at the start of the fifth day of competition.

Results

References

  (Digitally available at )
  (Excerpt available at )
 

Men's pistol military